Atri or Attri is a Vedic sage, who is credited with composing numerous hymns to Agni, Indra, and other Vedic deities of Hinduism. Atri is one of the Saptarishi (seven great Vedic sages) in the Hindu tradition, and the one most mentioned in its scripture Rigveda.

The fifth Mandala (Book 5) of the Rigveda is called the Atri Mandala in his honour, and the eighty seven hymns in it are attributed to him and his descendants.

Atri is also mentioned in the Puranas and the Hindu epics of the Ramayana and the Mahabharata.

Legend 

Atri is one of the seven great Rishi or Saptarshi along with Marichi, Angiras, Pulaha, Kratu, Pulastya and Vashistha. According to the legends of the Vedic era, sage Atri was married to Anasuya Devi. They had three sons, Dattatreya, Durvasa and Chandra. As per divine account, he is the last among the seven saptharishis and is believed to have originated from the tongue. The wife of Atri was Anasuya, who is considered one of the seven female pativratas. When instructed by divine voice to do penance, Atri readily agreed and did severe penance. Pleased by his devotion and prayers, the Hindu trinity, namely, Brahma, Vishnu and Shiva appeared before him and offered him boons. He sought all the three to be born to him. Another version of the legend states that Anasuya, by the powers of her chastity, rescued the three gods and in return, they were born as children to her. Brahma was born to her as Chandra, Vishnu as Dattatreya and Shiva in some part as Durvasa. The mention about Atri is found in various scriptures, with the notable being in Rig Veda. He is also associated with various ages, the notable being in Treta Yuga during Ramayana, when he and Anasuya advised Rama and his wife Sita. The pair is also attributed to bringing river Ganga down to earth, the mention of which is found in Shiva Purana.

He is said to be a resident of the south in Valmiki Ramayana. The same is supported by Puranic tradition.

Seer of Rig Veda 
He is the seer of the fifth Mandala (Book 5) of the Rigveda. Atri had many sons and disciples who have also contributed in the compilation of the Rig Veda and other Vedic texts. Mandala 5 comprises 87 hymns, mainly to Agni and Indra, but also to the Visvedevas ("all the gods'), the Maruts, the twin-deity Mitra-Varuna and the Asvins. Two hymns each are dedicated to Ushas (the dawn) and to Savitr. Most hymns in this book are attributed to the Atri clan composers, called the Atreyas.

The Atri hymns of the Rigveda are significant for their melodic structure as well as for featuring spiritual ideas in the form of riddles. These hymns include lexical, syntactic, morphological and verb play utilizing the flexibility of the Sanskrit language. The hymn 5.44 of the Rigveda in Atri Mandala is considered by scholars such as Geldner to be the most difficult riddle hymn in all of the Rigveda. The verses are also known for their elegant presentation of natural phenomenon through divinely inspired poems , such as poetically presenting dawn as a cheerful woman in hymn 5.80.

While the fifth mandala is attributed to Atri and his associates, sage Atri is mentioned or credited with numerous other verses of the Rigveda in other Mandalas, such as 10.137.4.

Ramayana 
In the Ramayana, Rama, Sita and Lakshmana visit Atri and Anasuya in their hermitage. Atri's hut is described to be in Chitrakuta, near a lake with divine music and songs, the water loaded with flowers, green water leaves, with many "cranes, fisherbirds, floating tortoises, swans, frogs and pink geese".

Puranas 
A number of sages named Atri are mentioned in the various medieval era Puranas. The legends therein about Atri are diverse and inconsistent. It is unclear if these refer to the same person, or to different Rishis who had the same name.

Cultural influence 

The Vaikhanasas sub-tradition within Vaishnavism found in South India near Tirupati, credit their theology to four Rishis (sages), namely Atri, Marichi, Bhrigu and Kashyapa. One of the ancient texts of this tradition is Atri Samhita, which survives in highly inconsistent fragments of manuscripts. The text are rules of conduct aimed at Brahmins of the Vaikhanasas tradition. The surviving parts of the Atri Samhita suggest that the text discussed, among other things, yoga, and ethics of living, with precepts such as:

The Vaikhanasas continue to be a significant community in South India, and they adhere to their Vedic heritage.

See also

Abhyasa
List of Indian philosophers
Bhartrihari

References

Sources

 
 
 
 Rigopoulos, Antonio (1998). Dattatreya: The Immortal Guru, Yogin, and Avatara.  New York: State University of New York Press. 
 

Brahmin gotras
Rishis
Prajapatis
Gotras
Rigvedic deities
Saptarishi